Bekir is a Turkish given name for males which comes from Abu Bakr the first Caliph of Islam.

Given name
 Bekir Fikri (1882–1914), Ottoman officer and revolutionary
 Bekir Sıtkı Bircan (1886–1967), Turkish footballer
 Bekir Bozdağ (born 1965), Turkish lawyer and politician
 Bekir Büyükarkın (1921–1998), Turkish poet, novelist and playwright
 Bekir Çoban-zade (1893–1937), Crimean Tatar poet and professor of Turkic languages 
 Bekir Coşkun, Turkish journalist
 Bekir Sıtkı Erdoğan (1926-2014), Turkish poet and songwriter
 Bekir Sami Günsav (1879–1934), officer of the Ottoman Army
 Bekir İrtegün (born 1984), Turkish footballer
 Bekir Karayel (born 1982), Turkish middle and long-distance runner
 Bekir Sami Kunduh, Turkish politician
 Bekir Küçükay, Turkish classical guitarist
 Bekir Ozan Has (born 1985), Turkish footballer
 Bekir Sami Kunduh (1867–1933), Turkish foreign minister
 Bakr Sidqi, Iraqi nationalist and general of Kurdish origin
 Bekir Özlü (born 1988), Georgian-Turkish judoka
 Bekir Rasim (born 1994), Bulgarian footballer of Turkish descent
 Bekir Refet (1899–1977), Turkish football player
 Bekir Sıtkı Sezgin (1936–1996), Turkish musician
 Bekir Yarangüme (born 1977), Turkish basketball player
 Bekir Ghazawna (born 1988), Turkish footballer
 Muhamed Bekir Kalajdžić (1892–1963), Bosnian writer, bookseller and publisher

Surname
 Erol Bekir (born 1974), Swedish-Macedonian football manager and former player of Turkish origin

Turkish masculine given names
Bosniak masculine given names